Christopher Earle Craige is a retired United States Air Force major general who last served as the commander of the Air Force Personnel Center. Previously, he was the director of strategy, engagement, programs of the United States Africa Command.

References

External links

Year of birth missing (living people)
Living people
Place of birth missing (living people)
United States Air Force generals